East Huaxia Road is a station on Line 2 of the Shanghai Metro.

Location and station layout 
The station is located beneath Third Huaxia Road, between Qingyi Road and the Huaxia Elevated Road. The station has three exits, numbered 1, 4, and 5. Exit 1 is branched northeast of the station, south of the Huaxia Elevated Road and east of Third Huaxia Road. Along the northwest side of the station is Exit 4 which is located west of Third Huaxia Road. Exit 5 is located south of Qingyi Road east of the station.

History 
By early March 2010, line 2 had been completed through . This extension originally used four-carriage trains as opposed to the eight-carriage trains used west of Guanglan Road, which served as the transfer point until eight-carriage through trains were introduced in April 2019.

References

External links 
East Huaxia Road at Explore Shanghai

Line 2, Shanghai Metro
Shanghai Metro stations in Pudong
Railway stations in China opened in 2010
Railway stations in Shanghai